Lyndon may refer to:

Places
 Lyndon, Alberta, Canada
 Lyndon, Rutland, East Midlands, England
 Lyndon, Solihull, West Midlands, England

United States
 Lyndon, Illinois
 Lyndon, Kansas
 Lyndon, Kentucky
 Lyndon, New York
 Lyndon, Ohio
 Lyndon, Pennsylvania
 Lyndon, Vermont
 Lyndon, Sheboygan County, Wisconsin, a town
 Lyndon, Juneau County, Wisconsin, a town

Other uses
 Lyndon State College, a public college located in Lyndonville, Vermont

People
 Lyndon (name), given name and surname

See also
 Lyndon School (disambiguation)
 Lyndon Township (disambiguation)
 
 Lydon (disambiguation)
 Lynden (disambiguation)
 Lindon (disambiguation)
 Linden (disambiguation)